Alan Cook (born 25 April 1992) is a Scottish footballer who plays for Open Goal Broomhill as a midfielder.

Career
Cook has previously played for Dumbarton, Stirling Albion, Airdrie United, Arbroath, East Fife, Alloa Athletic, as well as Stenhousemuir on loan.

In January 2020 he moved to Peterhead. After playing for Annan Athletic, he signed for Open Goal Broomhill for the 2022–23 season.

Career statistics

References

External links

1992 births
Living people
Scottish footballers
Dumbarton F.C. players
Stirling Albion F.C. players
Airdrieonians F.C. players
Arbroath F.C. players
East Fife F.C. players
Stenhousemuir F.C. players
Scottish Football League players
Scottish Professional Football League players
Association football midfielders
Alloa Athletic F.C. players
Peterhead F.C. players
Annan Athletic F.C. players
Broomhill F.C. (Scotland) players
Lowland Football League players